Ellen Troxclair is an American small business owner and politician who is a member of the Texas House of Representatives for District 19 and is a former member of the Austin City Council. She was the youngest woman ever elected to the Austin City Council and served on the Council from 2014 until 2018. She is a member of the Republican Party.  She defeated Justin Berry by 13% in the primary. She went on to face Democrat Pam Baggett and independent Kodi Sawin in the general election and won decisively with 72.6% of all votes cast.

She initially was running for the Texas Senate, to replace Dawn Buckingham but she was drawn out of the district. Pete Flores announced his candidacy for the seat and Buckingham endorsed Flores. So she set her sight on the 19th District seat.

Troxclair supports a ban on Democrats being given committee chairmanships as long as the Republicans hold the majority of seats in the Texas House.

References

Austin City Council members
Living people
Texas Republicans
Year of birth missing (living people)
21st-century American politicians
21st-century American women politicians
Republican Party members of the Texas House of Representatives
Women state legislators in Texas